Hillary Bacon Store, also known as Woolworth's, was a historic commercial building located in downtown Evansville, Indiana. It was designed by the architecture firm Shopbell & Company and built in 1921. It was in Chicago school style architecture.  It was destroyed by fire in 1990.

It was listed on the National Register of Historic Places in 1982 and delisted in 1993.

References

Former National Register of Historic Places in Indiana
Commercial buildings on the National Register of Historic Places in Indiana
Commercial buildings completed in 1921
Buildings and structures in Evansville, Indiana
National Register of Historic Places in Evansville, Indiana
Chicago school architecture in Indiana